Chandler Wooten (born April 25, 1999) is an American football linebacker for the Carolina Panthers of the National Football League (NFL).

Personal life and high school
Chandler Wooten was born on April 25, 1999, to Kelvin and Sandra Wooten. Wooten attended North Cobb High School, where was nominated an all-region and state player for Georgia and was a part of the Under Armour All-America game.

College career
Rated as the forty-fifth best college football player in Georgia, Wooten chose to attend Auburn University over the University of Tennessee. In Wooten's freshman year, he served in a backup role, recording sporadic tackles throughout the season. The following year, while not becoming the starter, Wooten was elevated in the depth chart and recorded more tackles than the year prior. In Wooten's junior year, he became the starting linebacker and solidified himself as a presence on the field. In what would have been his final season, Wooten sat out the year due to the Covid-19 pandemic. Wooten stayed for a fifth season at Auburn due to the NCAA allowing an extra year due to Covid-19 and performed his best, being voted team captain and winning the Shug Jordan Award.

Professional career

Arizona Cardinals
After going undrafted in the 2022 NFL Draft, Wooten was signed as an undrafted free agent by the Arizona Cardinals.
 Wooten did not make the active roster but was signed to the practice squad team of the Cardinals.

Carolina Panthers
After the Carolina Panthers traded Christian McCaffrey to the San Francisco 49ers and thus freed up a roster spot, the Panthers signed Wooten to their active roster from the Cardinals practice squad.

References

External links
Carolina Panthers bio
Auburn Tigers bio

Living people
1999 births
Carolina Panthers players
American football linebackers
Auburn Tigers football players